Kabanda is a village in the Bassar Prefecture in the Kara Region  of north-western Togo. The village is located west the towns of Afoou and Kalia and east of Sante Bas.

References

External links
Satellite map at Maplandia.com

Populated places in Kara Region
Bassar Prefecture